Johan Patricio Fuentes Muñoz (born 2 February 1984) is a Chilean footballer that currently plays for Deportes Santa Cruz in the Primera B de Chile.

Club career
In 2015, he reached the Torneo Clausura playing with Cobresal.

Honours

Club
Cobresal
Torneo Clausura: 2015

References

External links
 
 

1984 births
Living people
Chilean footballers
Cobreloa footballers
Cobresal footballers
Curicó Unido footballers
Unión La Calera footballers
Unión Española footballers
Deportes Melipilla footballers
San Luis de Quillota footballers
Deportes Iquique footballers
Deportes Temuco footballers
Chilean Primera División players
Primera B de Chile players
Association football midfielders